Dominique Dalcan (a.k.a. Snooze) is a French electronic musician and film composer. He is the winner of the "victoires de la musique" in 2018 in the category "electronic album".

History 
Dominique Dalcan spent his childhood and adolescence in Noisy-le-Grand, a suburb of Paris. He receives no real musical education. However, he began composing pieces on the piano as an autodidact, then worked for a while with the Rennes-based group Complot Bronswick. He is influenced by the composers Harold Budd and Brian Eno.

In 1992 he released his first album Entre l'étoile & le carré on Crammed Discs. He made his first concert at the Transmusicales festival in Rennes in 1991. His collaboration with Marc Hollander, the founder of this Belgian label, will last a decade. The album is described as a "miracle" of pop music. Dalcan is considered as a precursor of the new pop song made in France by mixing electronic and acoustic music.

In 1994, Dominique returns with the album Cannibale from which are extracted Le danseur de Java and Brian. The album is influenced by Anglo-Saxon orchestrations. He surrounds himself with the arranger David Whitaker and the musician Bertrand Burgalat. When the album was released, Dominique went on a tour in France with various groups and ended up on the main stage of the Francofolies festival in La Rochelle in 1995.

In 1996, Dalcan  sets up a parallel musical project: Snooze. We don't talk about French touch yet but Dominique is quoted in the English press with Laurent Garnier, Air, Daft Punk or Motorbass. Initially instrumental, The Man in the Shadow will be his first album under the name Snooze. The sound mixes dub, jazz, hip hop and drum and bass.

In 1997, he released the album Ostinato. Dominique records with Brazilian musicians such as Vinicius Cantuaria, collaborator of Arto Lindsay and Caetano Veloso, Paolo Braga and Cyro Baptista as well as the conductor Clare Fischer, arranger of Prince and João Gilberto among others. The singles of the album are : L'air de rien a duet with the singer Nancy Danino (already present on The Man in the Shadow, Snooze's first album in 1996), Individualistic and Plus loin mais jusqu'où.

The following year, Dalcan worked for the cinema with Alain Berliner's Ma vie en rose (Golden Globe for best foreign film and a nomination for music victories for Dominique).

He returns to electronic music under the pseudonym Snooze with Goingmobile in 2001. Three singers are featured on this album: Nancy Danino, American Nicole Graham, and Deborah Brown. Collaborations are multiplying with mixers such as Autechre, Uwe Schmidt with Señor Coconut and Isolée.

After two years of writing, Snooze's third album entitled Americana was released in January 2005. Snooze's third album but the first on her own label Ostinato.

In 2006, Dominique Dalcan released on his label, the Best of entitled Music hall which gathers his greatest pop songs with also some unreleased ones. It is consecrated by the daily newspaper Le Monde as "the pioneer of French pop". The same year, he will be victim of a heart attack. Dominique then moved away from music for two years.

In 2008, he collaborates with the young slam artist Luciole. Dominique Dalcan composes a large part of his songs and ensures the artistic realization. His first album Ombres was released in February 2009, awarded by L'Académie Charles-Cros.

Throughout his career, Dominique Dalcan has collaborated with both variety artists (Camille, Zazie, Hubert-Felix Thiefaine) and renowned electronic artists (Autechre, Ryuichi Sakamoto, Isolée aka Rajko Müller, Fila Brazillia).

In 2010, Dominique Dalcan released a new single in French, Paratonnerre, and is back on the air in 2011.

In 2013, he opened for Vanessa Paradis during the Love Songs Tour.

In 2014, Dominique releases the album Hirundo on Pias.

He also works with video. His personal work on this medium leads him, among other things, to realize his stage projections. Today, he incorporates sound design in his installations and intervenes on many projects by consulting music.

In 2017, Dalcan will release his new transversal creation, entitled Temperance. It speaks about his subject of a "post-electronic" universe, in that machines are used as real instruments. On Saturday, February 10, 2018, the album receives the Victoire de la Musique award in the category of Electronic or Dance Album of the Year.

In 2019, volume 2 of "Temperance" is released. He is assimilated to the French electro scene like Rone. The first single is entitled "Small Black Piece Of Field" produced by the artist on the theme of the anthropocene.

He directed the video clip "Done Enough For Your Man", the first extract from the album "Temperance 2" with the participation of the French actress Valérie Kaprisky.

In 2020, he plays for the first time "A woman saved my life" at the Centquatre in Paris. This sound and video installation is experienced as an immersive environment. Voices and testimonies intertwine and mix, materializing a narrative with multiple voices, a collective memory. Conducted in collaboration with several musicians and singers from the Arab world, this performance is composed of songs (French, English, Arabic), on sounds that make acoustic instruments from the Near East cohabit with the assertive electronic textures that have become Dominique Dalcan's trademark.

In 2020, Dominique took part in the compilation orchestrated by the techno musician Molecule with its opening track: Run Around The Block, an ode to support confinement. The profits will go to the Fondation de France to fight against Covid 19. The record will be record of the week on France Inter.

Discography Dominique Dalcan 

1991: Entre l’étoile et le carré
1994: Cannibale
1996: Cheval de Troie
1997: Ma vie en rose (Soundtrack)
1998: Ostinato
2005: Music-Hall
2014: Hirundo

Discography Snooze 

1997: The Man In The Shadow - (Crammed Discs)
2001: Goingmobile - (Crammed Discs)
2005: Americana  - (Ostinato)

Discography Temperance 
2017: TEMPERANCE
2018: TEMPERANCE Vol 2

Filmography
1997: Clueur 
1997: My Life in Pink
2006: Stealth

References

External links
Dominique Dalcan Official site
Snooze Official site

 Dominique Dalcan at Discogs
Biography at RFI Musique

Living people
French electronic musicians
French film score composers
French male film score composers
1964 births